Haugschlag is a municipality in the district of Gmünd in the Austrian state of Lower Austria.

Geography
It is Austria's northernmost municipality, located in the Waldviertel region close to the Czech border. It comprises the Katastralgemeinden of Griesbach, Haugschlag, Rottal, and Türnau.

References

External links
Municipal website

Cities and towns in Gmünd District